Thomas Augustinussen (born March 20, 1981) is a retired Danish professional footballer. He began his career as a striker, but moved gradually into the holding midfielder position. He made his senior debut with AaB, with whom he played 420 games and won the 2008 and 2014 Danish Superliga championship. He retired in the Summer of 2016 and became assistant coach in AaB. He has been capped twice for the Denmark national football team.

Club career
Augustinussen started his career with AaB. Due to his height of 192 cm and good speed, Augustinussen played his first years as a striker. He made his Danish Superliga debut for AaB in April 2000. He was a successful striker in his youth years, but had difficulty finding his goalscoring form as a senior. As he only managed to score 11 goals in his first three-and-a-half years as a senior, Augustinussen was stamped by a media pundit as being "not the fastest moped on the dockside" ("ikke den hurtigste knallert på havnen") in August 2003, and did not look like cutting it at the highest sporting level of Danish football.

However, Augustinussen was moved back to the centre midfield by new AaB coach Erik Hamren, where he established himself as a consistent part of the starting line-up. He suffered a knee injury in October 2006, but returned to the AaB side in August 2007, and helped the team win the 2007–08 Superliga championship. He was named team captain from the beginning of the 2008–09 season, and led AaB in the 2008-09 UEFA Champions League tournament. In total, he played 283 games and scored 36 goals for AaB, including 223 games and 29 goals in the Superliga until May 2009.

In April 2009, he signed a three-year contract with Austrian club FC Red Bull Salzburg, effective from July 2009. After one-and-a-half year in Salzburg, Augustinussen was released from Salzburg of his own will.

On 30 January 2011 AaB announced that they had signed Augustinussen on a three-year contract.

Three years later in the 2013-14 Danish Superliga season, Augustinussen and AaB won "The Double". It was the first time ever, that the club won the league and captured the Danish Cup as well. Augustinussen was captain in the historical season.

Coaching career

AaB
On March 17, 2016, it was announced, that Augustinussen would retire in the summer of 2016. He would continue in AaB as assistant coach.

International career
Augustinussen started his international career with the Under-19 national selection. He was capped 20 times for the Danish under-21 national team, with five goals the result.

In June 2008, he made his debut for the senior Denmark national football team in a friendly match 1–1 draw with Poland, coming on as a substitute to replace Christian Poulsen in the 77th minute. He played his second national team game in June 2009, replacing Christian Poulsen in the 71st minute of 1–0 win against Sweden in the 2010 FIFA World Cup qualification tournament.

Honours

Playing career 
AaB
Danish Superliga (2) 2007–08, 2013–14
Danish Cup (1) 2013–14
Red Bull Salzburg
Austrian Football Bundesliga (1) 2009–10

Individual 
Danish Cup Fighter of the year (årets pokalfighter) (1) 2009

References

External links 
Danish national team profile
AaB profile
Danish Superliga statistics
Guardian Football Teams

1981 births
Living people
Danish men's footballers
Denmark international footballers
Denmark under-21 international footballers
Denmark youth international footballers
Danish expatriate men's footballers
AaB Fodbold players
FC Red Bull Salzburg players
Danish Superliga players
Austrian Football Bundesliga players
Expatriate footballers in Austria
Association football midfielders
People from Svendborg
Sportspeople from the Region of Southern Denmark